Warren Washington Jenkins (December 22, 1942 – June 18, 2002) was an American right-handed pitcher in Major League Baseball. Born in Covington, Virginia, he pitched for the Washington Senators from 1962 to 1963 and for the Los Angeles Dodgers in 1969. Jenkins died at age 59 in Tampa, Florida.

External links
, or Retrosheet, or Pelota Binaria (Venezuelan Winter League)

1942 births
2002 deaths
Arizona Instructional League Dodgers players
Baseball players from Virginia
Buffalo Bisons (minor league) players
Burlington Senators players
Cardenales de Lara players
American expatriate baseball players in Venezuela
Florida Instructional League Senators players
Hawaii Islanders players
Lincoln Memorial Railsplitters baseball players
Los Angeles Dodgers players
Major League Baseball pitchers
Middlesboro Senators players
Montgomery Rebels players
People from Covington, Virginia
Raleigh Capitals players
Savannah Senators players
Spokane Indians players
Toronto Maple Leafs (International League) players
Washington Senators (1961–1971) players
York White Roses players